AG5 may refer to:

  (also written 2011 AG5), a near-Earth asteroid and potentially hazardous object
 The code of Pandan Indah LRT station, a Malaysian at-grade rapid transit station
 AG5, a 5-speed longitudinal transmission manufactured by Aisin Seiki

See also
 AG-5 (disambiguation)